Synchronised swimming at the 2015 World Aquatics Championships was held between 25 July and 1 August 2015 in Kazan, Russia.

Schedule
Nine events were held.

All time are local (UTC+3).

Medal summary

Medal table

Medal events

*Reserve

References

External links
Official website

 
Synchronised swimming
Synchronised swimming at the World Aquatics Championships
2015 in synchronized swimming